George Martin Papach (born April 27, 1925) is a former American football fullback who played for the Pittsburgh Steelers. He played college football at Purdue University, having previously attended Chaney High School in Youngstown, Ohio.

References

Living people
1925 births
American football fullbacks
Purdue Boilermakers football players
Pittsburgh Steelers players
Players of American football from Youngstown, Ohio